Ridolfo Luigi Boccherini (also , ; 19 February 1743 – 28 May 1805) was an Italian composer and cellist of the Classical era whose music retained a courtly and galante style even while he matured somewhat apart from the major European musical centers. He is best known for a minuet from his String Quintet in E, Op. 11, No. 5 (G 275), and the Cello Concerto in B flat major (G 482). The latter work was long known in the heavily altered version by German cellist and prolific arranger Friedrich Grützmacher, but has recently been restored to its original version.

Boccherini's output also includes several guitar quintets. The final movement of the Guitar Quintet No. 4 in D (G 448) is a fandango, a lively Spanish dance.

Biography

Boccherini was born into a musical family in Lucca, Italy in 1743. He was the third child of Leopoldo Boccherini, a cellist and double-bass player, and the brother of Giovanni Gastone Boccherini, a poet and dancer who wrote librettos for Antonio Salieri and Joseph Haydn. Luigi received his first music lessons at age five by his father, who taught him cello, and then continued his studies at age nine with Abbé Vanucci, music director of a local cathedral, at San Martino. When his son reached thirteen, Leopoldo Boccherini sent him to study in Rome with Giovanni Battista Costanzi. In 1757 Luigi Boccherini and his father both went to Vienna, where the court employed them as musicians in the Burgtheater. In 1761 Boccherini went to Madrid, entering in 1770 the employ of Infante Luis Antonio of Spain (1727–1785), younger brother of King Charles III of Spain. There, Boccherini flourished under royal patronage, until one day when the King expressed his disapproval at a passage in a new trio, and ordered Boccherini to change it. The composer, no doubt irritated with this intrusion into his art, doubled the passage instead, which led to his immediate dismissal. Then he accompanied Don Luis (the Infante) to Arenas de San Pedro, a little town in the Gredos Mountains in Ávila; there and in the nearest town of Candeleda Boccherini wrote many of his most famous works.

Later patrons included the French ambassador to Spain, Lucien Bonaparte (1775–1840), as well as King Friedrich Wilhelm II of Prussia (1744–1797), himself an amateur cellist, flautist, and avid supporter of the arts. Boccherini fell on hard times following the deaths of his Spanish patron (1785), his two wives (1785 and 1805), and his four daughters (1796, 1802 and 1804). He died in Madrid in 1805, survived by two sons. His body lay buried in the Pontifical Basilica of St. Michael in Madrid until 1927, when his remains were repatriated and buried in the church of San Francesco in his native Lucca.

Works

Much of Boccherini's chamber music follows models established by Joseph Haydn; however, Boccherini is often credited with improving Haydn's model of the string quartet by bringing the cello to prominence, whereas Haydn had frequently relegated it to an accompaniment role. Some sources for Boccherini's style are in the works of a famous Italian cellist, Giovanni Battista Cirri, who was born before Boccherini and before Haydn, and in Spanish popular music.

A virtuoso cellist, Boccherini often played violin repertoire on the cello, at pitch, a skill he developed by substituting for ailing violinists while touring. This supreme command of the instrument brought him much praise from his contemporaries (notably Pierre Baillot, Pierre Rode, and Bernhard Romberg), and is evident in the cello parts of his compositions (particularly in the quintets for two cellos, treated often as cello concertos with string quartet accompaniment).

He wrote a large amount of chamber music, including over one hundred string quintets for two violins, viola and two cellos (a type which he pioneered, in contrast with the then common scoring for two violins, two violas and one cello), a dozen guitar quintets, not all of which have survived, nearly a hundred string quartets, and a number of string trios and sonatas (including at least 19 for the cello). His orchestral music includes around 30 symphonies and 12 virtuoso cello concertos.

Boccherini's works have been catalogued by the French musicologist Yves Gérard (1932–2020) in the Gérard catalog, published in London (1969), hence the "G" numbers applied to his output.

With a ministerial decree dated 27 April 2006, the Opera Omnia of the composer Luigi Boccherini were promoted to the status of Italian National Edition.

Boccherini's style is characterized by Rococo charm, lightness, and optimism, and exhibits much melodic and rhythmic invention, coupled with frequent influences from the guitar tradition of his adopted country, Spain.

Recordings
 Complete Symphonies, Vol. I–VII, Deutsche Kammerakademie Neuss, Johannes Goritzki, CPO 999401-2
 Cello Concertos, Enrico Bronzi, Accademia I Filarmonici di Verona, Brilliant Classics 92618 (2005)
 Complete Flute Quintets, Vol. I–III, Rafael Ruibérriz de Torres, Francisco de Goya String Quartet, Brilliant Classics 96074 (2021)
 Guitar Quintets, Vol. I–III, Zoltán Tokos, Danubius String Quartet, Naxos 8.503255
 String Quintets, Vol. I–X, La Magnifica Comunita, Enrico Casazza, violin, Brilliant Classics 92503, 92889, 93076, 93346, 93566, 93820, 93744, 94002, 93977, 94961 (2005–2011)
Boccherini's music is heard in the 2003 feature film Master and Commander: The Far Side of the World.

Media

(All performed by Jacques Lochet, violin and synthesiser.)

See also

 Category:Compositions by Luigi Boccherini
 Romantic guitar
 Louis Picquot

References

External links 

 Boccherini Studies
 Luigi Boccherini's Complete Works
 
 Centro Studi Opera Omnia Luigi Boccherini
 Association Luigi Boccherini
 Classical Music Archives
 Luigi Boccherini 1743–1805
 
 Examples of Boccherini's works at The Classical Music Dictionary
 Luigi Boccherini. More extensive biography 
 Complete list of works at University of Quebec. Marked "under construction". 

 Trios, violins, violoncello, G. 83–88 (From the Sibley Music Library Digital Score Collection)
 Sonatas, harpsichord, violin, violoncello, G. 143–148 (From the Sibley Music Library Digital Score Collection)
 Luigi Boccherini Music Institute, Lucca
 

1743 births
1805 deaths
Musicians from Lucca
Italian Classical-period composers
Italian male classical composers
18th-century Italian composers
18th-century male musicians
18th-century musicians
Composers for cello
Composers for the classical guitar
Italian classical cellists
19th-century deaths from tuberculosis
String quartet composers
19th-century male musicians
19th-century musicians
Tuberculosis deaths in Spain